Michael Jacob Linn is a professional poker player who won event number 49 at the 2010 World Series of Poker for $609,493.

Biography
He was self-taught at no-limit hold'em, however his uncle is bracelet winner Barry Greenstein.  Mike Linn is a student at Cal Poly San Luis Obispo and is from San Diego, California.  He grew up in La Jolla with his brother Joe Linn, father Dan Linn, and mother Sandie Linn.  He currently lives in San Luis Obispo with two other high-stakes poker players, Daniel Ketchum and Noah Raynor.

References 

ESPN Poker - WSOP Event 49

Year of birth missing (living people)
Living people
American poker players
World Series of Poker bracelet winners
People from San Diego